"Glamorous" is a song recorded by American singer Fergie featuring American rapper Ludacris for the former's debut studio album, The Dutchess (2006). It was released as the third single from The Dutchess worldwide except for in the United Kingdom, where it served as the second single. The song was serviced to mainstream radios on January 23, 2007, and to Rhythmic radios on February 20, 2007, in the United States, through A&M Records, together with will.i.am Music Group and Interscope Records.

It was written by Fergie, Ludacris, will.i.am, Elvis Williams and Polow da Don; the latter also produced the song. "Glamorous" is an airy R&B song that has a slower feel from the album's previous hip hop and dance-tinged singles. The lyrics deal with the lead staying rooted despite her success and fame. "Glamorous" garnered generally mixed to positive reviews from music critics, who commented on its smooth, generic sound and its lyrics, which have been likened to those of Gwen Stefani's "Luxurious" (2005), Jennifer Lopez's "Jenny from the Block" (2002) and Madonna's "Material Girl" (1985).

The song achieved commercial success worldwide, peaking inside the top 10 in several countries, including Australia, Ireland and the United Kingdom. "Glamorous" peaked at number one on the Billboard Hot 100 and became Fergie's second number one hit on the chart as a solo artist. The song also became her third best-selling song in the United States, amassing sales of over 3,000,000 copies as of August 2012, and earning a double platinum certification by the Recording Industry Association of America (RIAA). The music video for "Glamorous" features Fergie in scenes in which she portrays a successful actress and a teenager, acting as flashbacks from her past. The song was heavily sampled by Jack Harlow for his 2022 single "First Class", which also went number one on the Billboard Hot 100.

Background
"Glamorous" was written by the artists alongside will.i.am, Elvis Williams and producer Polow da Don. will.i.am, was in charge of the song's arrangement while Ron Fair produced the additional vocals present on the track. The song features co-writer Williams, who provided the keys, and Mike Hartnett, who played the guitars. The technical work performed on "Glamorous" includes engineering, which was orchestrated principally by Travis Daniels and was assisted by Mack Woodward. Tal Herzberg, who has worked the Black Eyed Peas on previous studio recordings, performed additional engineering on the track with the use of Pro Tools. Tony Maserati was signed as the principal mix engineer while Ryan Kennedy assisted him at The Record Plant in Hollywood, California. The song was finally recorded at Tree Sound Studios in Atlanta, Georgia and The Record Plant in Hollywood, California by "Angry" Mike Eleopoulos.

"Glamorous" was released as the third single from The Dutchess (2006), after "London Bridge" and "Fergalicious". A&M Records, together with will.i.am Music Group and Interscope Records, solicited the song to mainstream radios on January 23, 2007, and to Rhythmic radios on February 20, 2007, in the United States. It was later released as a single around the world on March 16, 2007, as a CD single.

Composition

"Glamorous" is a downtempo R&B song that has a smooth, silky feel and contains elements of techno. Music critics likened the song to Gwen Stefani's "Luxurious" and Jennifer Lopez's "Jenny from the Block". According to Dan Gennoe of Yahoo! Music, the song is comparable to the music of Janet Jackson. Spence D. of IGN noted that the song contained a mid-1980s vibe and influences of musical works by Madonna and Prince. According to the digital music sheet published at Musicnotes.com by EMI Music Publishing, the song was written in a key of C major. Having a beat measure of 130 beats per minute, it is set in common time and moves through a moderately fast tempo. The vocals range from a low register of E3 to a high register of C5. It has a basic sequence of G-Am7-Fmaj7 as its chord progression. Lyrically, "Glamorous" is an autobiographical account about how Fergie has remained true to her background, despite widespread fame and mainstream success. It also samples “If You Ain't Got No Money” by Raheem the Dream.

Critical reception
Bill Lamb of About.com gave "Glamorous" a three and a half star rating, praising the song's smooth R&B feel but dismissed its use of spelling out the title in the lyrics. Lamb also noted that "The frequent sparks of self-referential humor present in much of Fergie's music are missing here which limits the distinctiveness of this song" and explained it "veers a bit uncomfortably close" to Gwen Stefani's 2005 single "Luxurious" (Love. Angel. Music. Baby., 2004). He concluded his review, writing "unlikely to be a 3rd #1 for Fergie, and it may even struggle for top 10 status, but it is likely to linger as pleasant pop filler on the radio for the first few months of 2007." Spence D. of IGN called the song "somewhat generic", praising Fergie's flow and Ludacris' appearance on the track, but ultimately called it a "rather vapid exercise".

Liz Black of Cinema Blend called "Glamorous" "a stunning account of her ability to keep it real despite life in the first class." Kelefa Sanneh of New York Times wrote "Glamorous" and "Clumsy" to be songs fans can savor. Brian Rafferty of Idolator praised it as a "perfect No. 1 for a quarter when there ain’t shit else going on" and called Fergie's mid-song interjection of "fuck y'all" more convincing than the profanities present in RJD2's The Third Hand (2007), naming it the best gratuitous curse word in the top ten.

Commercial performance
In the United States, "Glamorous" made its debut on the Billboard Hot 100 at number 98 on the issue dated January 27, 2007, while the previous single "Fergalicious" was still inside the top five. A month later, it rose to number nine, in that week becoming the "greatest digital gainer". In the following week, it fell to number 33 following the removal of the single from digital retailers. "Glamorous" returned in the top 10 after its re-release, rising from number 55, and peaked at number one on the issue dated March 24, 2007, selling 166,000 downloads during that week. It became her second number one single in the United States and held the top position for two weeks. The single spent 29 weeks on the Billboard Hot 100, 24 of which were in the top 50. The single went on to sell 3,012,000 digital downloads in the United States, enough to earn a double-platinum certification by the Recording Industry Association of America (RIAA). "Glamorous" stands as Fergie's third best-selling single behind "Big Girls Don't Cry" and "Fergalicious". The song was moderately successful on Billboard component charts Adult Pop Songs and Hot R&B/Hip-Hop Songs, while achieving chart topping success on Hot Dance Club Songs and reaching number two on Pop Songs. In Canada, the song reached number 12 on the Canadian Hot 100 and lasted 11 weeks on the chart.

The commercial reception of "Glamorous" in other countries was generally positive, with some countries matching the success experienced in the United States. In Australia, the song debuted at number 10 on the singles chart. It eventually rose to number two on May 28, 2007, being held off by Avril Lavigne's "Girlfriend". The song eventually left the chart after 26 weeks, selling 70,000 copies in the country and earned a platinum certification by the Australian Recording Industry Association (ARIA). On the 2007 end of the year charts, it ranked number 10 on the singles chart and number six on the urban chart. "Glamorous" entered the New Zealand Top 40, like in Australia, at number 10. The song ascended and come down within the top 20 for nine weeks, reaching number nine twice during that time. The song shipped over 7,500 copies to New Zealand, earning a gold certification by the Recording Industry Association of New Zealand. In the United Kingdom, the song made its first appearance on the singles chart on February 18, 2007, at number 56. It jumped to number 27 the next week and continued rising until its seventh week, when it peaked at number six. The song spent three weeks inside the top 10 and exited the chart after six months. According to The Official Charts Company, the song sold 205,000 copies in the United Kingdom. In Ireland, the song reached a peak position of number three in its seventh week like it did in the United Kingdom, but lasted inside the top 10 longer (ten weeks).

Music video
Directed by Dave Meyers, and shot in an anamorphic 1.85:1 widescreen aspect ratio, the video, which had its world premiere on MTV's TRL on February 7, 2007, begins in the year 1994 with Fergie and Polow da Don at a keg party in East Los Angeles before she was famous, with everyone at the party shouting "If you ain't got no money take yo broke ass home". The camera then rotates upward where it is present day and Fergie is lounging in a Gulfstream G550 business jet, and as the chorus suggests, "flying first class, up in the sky". The captain is played by Freddy Rodriguez. She is seen watching the music video on her LG enV for her band's "Pump It". Fergie then lands and enters a limo waiting for her where she goes with her friends to a drive thru at a Taco Hall, as indicated by the takeout bag she collects, though the lyrics comment that this is Taco Bell instead. The video at this point does a transition to the past (1990s) where it is suggested Fergie came to this same restaurant with her friends before her glamorous life. The transition occurs as Fergie sings of the days when she had a Mustang. The limo transforms into a Mustang convertible. She and her friends are wearing fashion and have hairstyles similar to those of 1980s pop culture. The video then returns to present day where Fergie and Ludacris are shown shooting a film called Glamorous, a throwback to Bonnie and Clyde. The couple are shown holding Thompson submachine guns while being held up by police near a canyon, apparently for stealing money. Ludacris raps his verse to Fergie telling her all the expensive things he will buy for her. Fergie and Ludacris are then shown shooting down the cops, after which the film shoot ends. After the shoot, Fergie proceeds to sit in a chair with her name on it, as people rush over to do her makeup. While this is happening, she thanks her fans for making her famous. Scenes of this are intercut with Fergie getting back on the plane she came on, while she flashes back to when she was younger, where her father warned her about the coldness of show business. Fergie is then shown at the same kegger from earlier in the video, with her Black Eyed Peas bandmate apl.de.ap, Alfonso Ribeiro, Polow da Don, and B-Real from Cypress Hill with whom she clinks plastic glasses, followed with the plane she is on in the present day flying into London as the sun sets.

Track listing
 UK CD single
 "Glamorous" (album version) – 4:07
 "True" (Spandau Ballet cover) – 3:45
 Europe CD1
 "Glamorous" (album version) – 4:08
 "Glamorous" (Space Cowboy Remix) – 4:37
 Europe CD2 & Australian CD single
 "Glamorous" (album version) – 4:08
 "Glamorous" (Space Cowboy Remix) – 4:37
 "True" (Spandau Ballet cover) – 3:48
 "Glamorous" (music video) – 4:10

Credits and personnel
Recording and mixing
 Recorded at Tree Sound Studios in Atlanta, Georgia and The Record Plant in Hollywood, California.
 Mixed at The Record Plant in Hollywood, California.

Personnel
 Stacy Ferguson, Jamal Jones, Will Adams, Elvis Williams – songwriting
 Polow da Don – production, drum programming
 will.i.am – arrangement
 Ron Fair – additional vocal production
 Elvis Williams – keyboards
 Mike Hartnett – guitar
 Travis Daniels – engineering
 Mack Woodward – assistant engineering
 Tal Herzberg – Pro Tools engineering
 Tony Maserati – mixing
 Ryan Kennedy – assistant engineering
 "Angry" Mike Eleopoulos – recording

Credits adapted from the liner notes of The Dutchess, A&M Records, Will.i.am Music Group, Interscope Records.

Charts

Weekly charts

Year-end charts

Certifications

Release history

See also
 List of Billboard Hot 100 number-one singles of 2007
 List of number-one dance singles of 2007 (U.S.)

References

2006 songs
2007 singles
Fergie (singer) songs
Ludacris songs
Billboard Hot 100 number-one singles
Music videos directed by Dave Meyers (director)
Song recordings produced by Polow da Don
Songs written by Polow da Don
Songs written by Ludacris
Songs written by Blac Elvis
Songs written by Fergie (singer)
Songs written by will.i.am
Songs about consumerism
Songs about fame
Interscope Records singles
A&M Records singles